Lisbon is a town in St. Lawrence County, New York, United States. The population was 4,102 at the 2010 census.

By some accounts, the town is named after Lisbon, the capital of Portugal. However, the 1810 US Census for the town shows the town's name as Lisburn, which is a city located in Northern Ireland adjacent to the capital of Belfast. Belfast was the birthplace of Alexander Macomb, the prosperous New York City merchant of Loyalist sympathies. Earlier in 1791, he purchased much of Northern New York along the St. Lawrence River and Lake Ontario, which the state had released for public sale after cession of the land by the Iroquois. With partners, Macomb sold the land for development. The Town of Lisbon is in the northern part of the county and is northwest of Canton.

History 
The first European-American settler arrived around 1799. Many migrants arrived in the area from New England and were eager to buy land. Macomb and his partners believed that upstate New York was strategic for prosperous development, as they were depending on the growing trade with Canada across the St. Lawrence River and Lake Ontario. Two factors worked against this: the War of 1812, preceded by the Embargo Act of 1807 (which damaged the upstate economy because trade with Upper Canada was prohibited); and the construction of the Erie Canal in 1824, which enabled transportation between areas accessible to the Great Lakes and New York City. Development and population flowed west.

The Town of Lisbon was the first town in the county; it was formed in 1801, before the county was established. The former Lisbon Railroad Depot, now operated as the town museum, was listed on the National Register of Historic Places in 2000.  Also listed are the Lisbon Town Hall, the United Presbyterian Church, and the Hepburn Library of Lisbon.

Geography
The northern town line is marked by the St. Lawrence River, which is the international border with Canada, the Province of Ontario. The town borders Ogdensburg, New York at its northwest corner. New York State Route 37 and New York State Route 68 are highways that converge west of the town in Ogdensburg. NY-37 follows the south bank of St. Lawrence River in a northeasterly direction, and NY-68 runs southeasterly to Canton.

Demographics

As of the census of 2000, there were 4,047 people, 1,468 households, and 1,101 families residing in the town.  The population density was 37.4 people per square mile (14.4/km2).  There were 1,719 housing units at an average density of 15.9 per square mile (6.1/km2).  The racial makeup of the town was 98.27% White, 0.12% African American, 0.57% Native American, 0.17% Asian, 0.07% from other races, and 0.79% from two or more races. Hispanic or Latino of any race were 0.52% of the population.

There were 1,468 households, out of which 36.4% had children under the age of 18 living with them, 60.4% were married couples living together, 9.4% had a female householder with no husband present, and 25.0% were non-families. 19.5% of all households were made up of individuals, and 7.6% had someone living alone who was 65 years of age or older.  The average household size was 2.75 and the average family size was 3.10.

In the town, the population was spread out, with 27.9% under the age of 18, 8.0% from 18 to 24, 27.6% from 25 to 44, 24.6% from 45 to 64, and 12.0% who were 65 years of age or older.  The median age was 37 years. For every 100 females, there were 100.0 males.  For every 100 females age 18 and over, there were 96.4 males.

The median income for a household in the town was $35,772, and the median income for a family was $38,384. Males had a median income of $30,558 versus $25,525 for females. The per capita income for the town was $15,784.  About 7.5% of families and 14.1% of the population were below the poverty line, including 21.5% of those under age 18 and 4.5% of those age 65 or over.

Notable person
Rick Carlisle – Former NBA player and current coach of the Indiana Pacers

Communities and locations in Lisbon 

Benedict Island – An island in the St. Lawrence River between Galop Island and the mainland.
Chimney Island – A small island in the St. Lawrence River north of Chimney Point.
Chimney Point – A projection into the St. Lawrence River and the location of the Ogdensburg Prescott International Bridge.
Flackville – A hamlet in the western part of the town on NY-68 at County Road 10.
Galop Island – An island in the St. Lawrence River, formerly called Isle au Gallaup.
Galop Island State Park – A state park on Galop Island.
Gregory Corners – A location east of Lisbon village at the junction of County Roads 27 and 30.
Hague Crossing – A hamlet near the northeastern town line on County Road 30.
Lisbon – The hamlet of Lisbon is on County Road 10 (Lisbon Road) at the junction of County Road 27 (Morley-Lisbon Road) near the center of the town.
North Corners – A location north of Lisbon village at County Roads 27 and 28.
Pine Grove – A hamlet near the northeastern town line on County Road 28 at County Road 11.
Red Mills – A hamlet near the St. Lawrence River on NY-37, formerly known as Galloupville.
Sparrowhawk Point – A location on the south bank of the St. Lawrence River.

References

External links
  Town of Lisbon, NY
 Hepburn Library of Lisbon
  Lisbon Town Historian's site
  Lisbon Town Recreation Website
  Summer sunset at Lisbon Beach
 Lisbon Depot Museum photos:   
  Lights on the River - Holiday Light Display @ the Lisbon Beach & Campgrounds

Towns in St. Lawrence County, New York